J. Stephanus Stadium is a sports venue in Keetmanshoop in the ǁKaras Region of southern Namibia. It is the home stadium of Fedics United F.C. of the Namibia Premier League.

References

Keetmanshoop
Buildings and structures in ǁKaras Region
Football venues in Namibia